
Gmina Braniewo is a rural gmina (administrative district) in Braniewo County, Warmian-Masurian Voivodeship, in northern Poland, on the border with Russia. Its seat is the town of Braniewo, although the town is not part of the territory of the gmina.

Villages
Gmina Braniewo contains the villages and settlements of Bemowizna, Bobrowiec, Brzeszczyny, Cielętnik, Działy, Elżbiecin, Garbina, Glinka, Goleszewo, Grodzie, Gronówko, Gronowo, Grzechotki, Grzędowo, Jarocin, Józefowo, Kalina, Kalinówek, Kiersy, Klejnówko, Klejnowo, Krasnolipie, Krzewno, Lipowina, Maciejewo, Marcinkowo, Mikołajewo, Młoteczno, Nowa Pasłęka, Pęciszewo, Podgórze, Podleśne, Prątnik, Prętki, Rogity, Różaniec, Rudłowo, Rusy, Rydzówka, Stara Pasłęka, Stępień, Strubiny, Świętochowo, Szyleny, Ujście, Ułowo, Wielewo, Wikielec, Wilki, Wola Lipowska, Zakrzewiec, Zawierz, Żelazna Góra and Zgoda.

Neighbouring gminas
Gmina Braniewo is bordered by the town of Braniewo and by the gminas of Frombork, Lelkowo, Pieniężno and Płoskinia. It also borders Russia (Kaliningrad oblast).

References
Polish official population figures 2006

Braniewo
Braniewo County